The 1998 Frankfurt Galaxy season was the sixth season for the franchise in the NFL Europe League (NFLEL). The team was led by head coach Dick Curl in his first year, and played its home games at Waldstadion in Frankfurt, Germany. They finished the regular season in first place with a record of seven wins and three losses. In World Bowl '98, Frankfurt lost to the Rhein Fire 34–10.

Offseason

NFL Europe League draft

NFL allocations

Personnel

Staff

Roster

Schedule

Standings

Game summaries

Week 5: vs Rhein Fire

Week 6: at Barcelona Dragons

Week 9: vs Scottish Claymores

World Bowl '98

References

Frankfurt Galaxy seasons